Afghanistan competed at the 2019 World Aquatics Championships in Gwangju, South Korea from 12 to 28 July.

Swimming

Afghanistan sent two swimmers.

Men

References

Nations at the 2019 World Aquatics Championships
Afghanistan at the World Aquatics Championships
2019 in Afghan sport